Goki Uemura (born 1943) is a Canadian judoka who represented Canada in the 1973 World Judo Championships in the -70 kg category.  He is one of just seventeen Canadian judoka to achieve the rank of hachidan (eighth dan) and co-founded the Shin Bu Kan Judo Club in Etobicoke, Ontario in 1982, which later relocated in Mississauga, Ontario and is now also known as the Mississauga Judo Club.

See also
Judo in Ontario
Judo in Canada
List of Canadian judoka

References

Canadian male judoka
1943 births
Living people